Houman Dehlavi (born 1971) is an Iranian musician and composer.

Biography 
Houman Dehlavi was born in 1971 in Tehran. He learned to play the santur from his mother, Susan Aslani when he was a child. At the age of ten, he practiced playing the piano for five years with Farman Behboud. Meanwhile, along with his sister Haleh Dehlavi, he also learned playing the violin with musicians such as Manouchehr Ansari, Partow Pourafar, Behrouz Vahidiyeh Azar and Siavash Zahir al-Dini. He first learned the fundamentals of music from his father Hossein Dehlavi and later with musicians such as Parviz Mansouri and Ahmad Pejman. After he finished high school with graphics diploma from Tehran School of Visual Arts in 1993 and with the establishment of classical music courses in Azad University he started his major in playing the piano and benefited from trainings of Rafael Minaskanian and Chista Gharib. As he was studying at the university he started teaching music as well as composing music for theaters and also attended open music courses by musicians such as Emanuel Malik Aslanian and Mehran Rouhani. He also benefited from trainings of Thomas Christian David by participating in master course of music composition and conducting. Ardeshir Rouhani and Golriz Hashemi are also among his teachers.

In 1998, with the establishment of the first postgraduate course of music composition in Iran, having gained the first place in national university entrance exam he entered Tehran University of Art. Under supervision of Ahmad Pejman, he presented his master's thesis in music composition including a work of four movements based on Iranian melodies for the symphonic orchestra. Then he was a lecturer at the University of Arts in 2000 as he graduated.

Houman Dehlavi travelled to countries such as Austria, Slovakia, Canada, and the U.S. for further music experiences and collaborated with other musicians in composing, arrangement, recording and performances. He chose the U.S. and Iran to live in and by establishing an orchestra, he performed Iranian music in the United States. He also participated in National Festival of Youth Music and was a member of jury in University of Arts Music Festival.

Artworks 
Some of Houman Dehlavi's works:

 The book Three Pieces by Hosein Dehlavi, arrangement for piano by Houman Dehlavi 
 The book Seven Skies, 18 pieces for piano
 Music album Days of Not Being, vocalist Salar Aghili
 Daaman Keshan (based on the melody of Saari Galin), vocalist Bijan Bijani
 Symphonic Movement, for symphonic orchestra
 Fantasy, for Qanun and Orchestra
 Dream of the plain, for ney, harp and string orchestra
 Arrangement and conducting Ragse Irani, composed by Mahin Zarinpanjeh
 Dream, for piano
 Lullabies, for piano
 Adobe and Alas 
 Music for the play Without Farewell, directed by Katayoun Feyz Marandi
 Music for the play Notebook, directed by Katayoun Feyz Marandi
 Music for the play Window, directed by Jaleh MohammadAli

References 

Iranian composers
Living people
1971 births
Iranian pianists
Iranian emigrants to the United States
21st-century pianists
Iranian violinists
21st-century violinists